Lactobacillus delbrueckii is a species of bacteria in the family Lactobacillaceae. It is part of the microbiota of the lower reproductive tract of women.

History

Naming 
The species carries the name of Max Delbrück, who lent his name to the Berlin Institute for the Fermentation Industries, where L. delbrueckii and L. delbrueckii subsp. bulgaricus were produced on an industrial scale from about 1896. (Delbrück's Institute was located in East Berlin and around 1967 it was renamed Institut für Gärungsgewerbe und Biotechnologie zu Berlin (IFGB).)

Subspecies
A paper published in 1983 by Weiss, Schillinger, and Kandler, described the high degree of shared identity between L. delbrueckii 's subspecies, which had previously been considered separate species.

References

External links
Type strain of Lactobacillus delbrueckii at BacDive -  the Bacterial Diversity Metadatabase

Lactobacillaceae